Harrison Middleton University is a private distance-learning university offering Master of Arts, Doctor of Arts, and Doctor of Education programs in the humanities. Harrison Middleton University focuses its scope on the Great Books.

Founded in 1998, it is nationally accredited by the Distance Education Accrediting Commission, which is recognized by the United States Department of Education and the Council for Higher Education Accreditation.

References

External links 
 

Distance education institutions based in the United States
Distance Education Accreditation Commission
Educational institutions established in 1998
1998 establishments in Arizona
Liberal arts colleges in Arizona